The Move were a British rock band formed in December 1965. They scored nine top 20 UK singles in five years, but were among the most popular British bands not to find any real success in the United States. Although bassist-vocalist Chris "Ace" Kefford was the original leader, for most of their career the Move was led by guitarist, singer and songwriter Roy Wood. He wrote all the group's UK singles and, from 1968, also sang lead vocals on many songs, although Carl Wayne was the main lead singer up to 1970. Initially, the band had 4 main vocalists (Wayne, Wood, Trevor Burton and Kefford) who split the lead vocals on a number of their earlier songs.

The Move evolved from several mid-1960s Birmingham based groups, including Carl Wayne & the Vikings, the Nightriders and the Mayfair Set. Their name referred to the move various members of these bands made to form the group. Besides Wood, the Move's original five-piece roster in 1965 was drummer Bev Bevan, bassist Kefford, vocalist Carl Wayne and guitarist Trevor Burton. The final line-up of 1972 was the trio of Wood, Bevan and Jeff Lynne; together, they rode the group's transition into the Electric Light Orchestra. Between 2007 and 2014, Burton and Bevan performed intermittently as "The Move featuring Bev Bevan and Trevor Burton."

Members

Official

Unofficial

Timeline

Lineups

References

The Move